Joseph Crockett Shaffer (January 19, 1880October 19, 1958) was a U.S. Representative from Virginia.

Biography
Born near Wytheville, Virginia, Shaffer attended the Wytheville public schools.
He was graduated from Plummer College in Wytheville in 1902 and from the law department of the University of Virginia in 1904.
He was admitted to the bar in 1904 and commenced practice in Wytheville.
He served as Commonwealth's Attorney of Wythe County 1908-1912.
He served as assistant United States district attorney in the years 1920-1924 and served as United States attorney for the western district of Virginia from 1924-1929.

Shaffer was elected as a Republican to the Seventy-first Congress (March 4, 1929–March 3, 1931).
He was an unsuccessful candidate for reelection in 1930 to the Seventy-second Congress.
He was reappointed United States Attorney for the Western District of Virginia, serving from 1931 until his resignation in 1932.
He resumed the private practice of law.
Shaffer was a stockholder and officer in Wythe County National Bank.
He served as delegate to the Republican National Convention in 1940.
He died in Abingdon, Virginia, and was interred in St. John's Church Cemetery, Wytheville.

Sources

External links

 

1880 births
1958 deaths
County and city Commonwealth's Attorneys in Virginia
University of Virginia School of Law alumni
People from Wytheville, Virginia
United States Attorneys for the Western District of Virginia
Republican Party members of the United States House of Representatives from Virginia
20th-century American politicians